The Kosai River is a small river located near Kharagpur in the Indian state of West Bengal. It is the primary source of water supply for the township and the Indian Institute of Technology, Kharagpur.

See also

List of rivers of India
Rivers of India

References

Rivers of West Bengal
Rivers of India